Kshemamga Velli Labhamga Randi is a 2000 Telugu-language comedy film directed by Raja Vannem Reddy. The film features an ensemble cast of Srikanth, Rajendra Prasad, Brahmanandam, Ramya Krishna, Roja, Preethi and Kovai Sarala, with music composed by Vandemataram Srinivas. The film is produced by M. V. Lakshmi under the ML Art Movies banner and is presented by Editor Mohan. A remake of the Tamil film Viralukketha Veekkam (1999), it was released on 4 February 2000, and did well at the box office.

Plot 
Ravi, Rambabu and Jambulingam work as mechanics in a car company. Geetha, Janaki and Subbalakshmi are their wives respectively. These three families live in the same neighbourhood. The trio is a group of wayward husbands, their weakness lies in boozing and spending half of their salary on unnecessary items and their wives always find it impossible to make ends meet. Apart from being spendthrifts, they are often borrowing money from the office peon Bezawada, who in turn is a thug and is known for his ruthless approach towards recovering his money from debtors.

Baby / Bala Tripura Sundari, a supervisor in a garment company, moves into a new house in their neighbourhood house with her kind-hearted husband. The husbands are not impressed with the newly moved Baby and her husband, as they lead their lives in a well-planned financial manner. Upon seeing this, the wives make up their mind to work and thus, request Baby to recommend a job for them in her company. However, the husbands disapprove of this move because they feel that the wives should depend on them in all aspects. In parallel, they were promised a yearly bonus of pay at their workplace, which was later reneged. To voice their anger, the trio threatens the owner of the company, which leads to their dismissal.

Jembulingam decides to approach his childhood friend Appala Raju, a wealthy merchant in Bangalore, for a job. He is offered a partnership at an unbelievable wage, unaware that the business is all about smuggling drugs—during the police raid they are battered and bruised. In the meantime, the peon Bezawada creates a ruckus at the homes of the trio and reveals to the wives the details of the debts. To make up for their husband's financial catastrophe, the wives decide to work. The husbands are infuriated at this and this leads to misunderstandings among each couple. After a series of controversies, the wives are kicked out of their houses and are given shelter by the kind-hearted Baby and her husband.

Meanwhile, Ravi's daughter is down with a heart defect and is in need of immediate treatment. With no help, the trio finally approaches Appala Raju. He makes a deal, according to which trio must smuggle Ganja for the money they need for the operation. In the process, they are caught and put behind bars and beaten by the police. Ultimately, they realise their follies and the wives bail them out, hoping that they would lead a more responsible and a happy life.

Cast

Soundtrack 
Music composed by Vandemataram Srinivas. Music released on Supreme Music Company.

Release and reception 
Kshemamga Velli Labhamga Randi was released on 4 February 2000. Sify said the film "is far superior to the original". Jeevi of Idlebrain.com said, "In a way, this film is very good one if you prefer watching a pure comedy. But if you prefer a story oriented film, this film might fail deliver the goods! But for Brahmanandam and Kovai Sarala this film stands as another feather in their cap". The success of the film prompted editor-producer Mohan to continue to invest in other film projects. With the financial gain from Kshemamga Velli Labhamga Randi, he launched a film with his son Mohan Raja as director.

References

External links 
 

2000 comedy-drama films
2000 films
2000s Telugu-language films
Indian comedy-drama films
Telugu remakes of Tamil films